Hot Day in Waco is a studio album by Dogbowl and Kramer, released on October 31, 1994 by Shimmy Disc.

Track listing

Personnel 
Adapted from Hot Day in Waco liner notes.

Musicians
Dogbowl – vocals, guitar
Kramer – vocals, instruments, production, engineering

Production and additional personnel
 DAM – design
 Michael Macioce – photography

Release history

References

External links 
 Hot Day in Waco at Discogs (list of releases)

1994 albums
Collaborative albums
Albums produced by Kramer (musician)
Dogbowl albums
Kramer (musician) albums
Shimmy Disc albums